Don Pedro Caro y Sureda, 3rd Marquis of La Romana (2 October 1761 – 23 January 1811) was a Spanish general of the Peninsular War.

Biography
Born at Palma de Mallorca to a family of Balearic nobility, Romana was educated in France and, upon the death of his father, was awarded a commission in the Spanish Royal Navy by King Charles III. He studied at the University of Salamanca and entered the Seminario de Nobles in Madrid.

Like many Spanish officers of the Napoleonic era, Romana served in the American Revolutionary War in his youth. In 1783, he participated in the reconquest of Menorca from the British. In the final months of the war, he was assigned to the blockade of Gibraltar.

Romana retired from the military after the war and began travelling Europe. Evidence suggests he was actually dispatched on missions of diplomacy or espionage, for which his knowledge of foreign languages would have been a valuable asset.

In 1793, Romana entered the army as a cavalry colonel and fought against France in the War of the First Coalition. Initially he served under his uncle, General Ventura Caro, where he was promoted after distinguishing himself as a competent commander. Although the war ended poorly for Spain under French occupation, he ended the war as a teniente-general. He was made Captain General of Catalonia in 1802 and Chief of the Engineering Corps in 1805.

King Charles IV, bullied and pressured by Napoleon, agreed in 1807 to provide a veteran infantry division to bolster the French army in Germany. Romana was made commander of this "Division of the North" and spent 1807 and 1808 performing garrison duties in Hamburg and later Denmark under Marshal Bernadotte.

When the Peninsular War broke out, La Romana made plans with the British to repatriate his men to Spain. The success of the evacuation of the La Romana Division was chiefly credited to his subterfuge and resourcefulness. At least 9,000 men of the 15,000-strong division were immediately able to board British ships on 27 August and escape to Spain. Their defection reduced Bernadotte's "Hanseatic Army" to a string of glorified coastal garrisons, severely sapping Napoleon's left (north) wing in the contest with Austria for mastery over central Europe in 1809.

Romana arrived at Santander on the Cantabrian front and received command of the Army of Galicia on 11 November. Fate was crueler to him than he deserved, as this army, under General Blake, was destroyed in battle that same day. On 26 November, La Romana assumed effective command of what remained of the army – 6,000 men all told.

With this force, he fought some rearguard actions for General Moore's retreat westwards to Corunna. Using his limited means, Romana conducted small scale attacks against the French in 1809. These met with success and his men were able to distract the French and overwhelm isolated garrisons such as Villafranca. Following the French defeat at Puente San Payo on 6 June, Marshal Soult abandoned his attempts to reestablish French rule in Galicia. When Soult moved against the British on the Portuguese frontier, Romana drove the French from Asturias as well.

Romana was appointed to the Central Junta on 29 August and served until 1810. He then returned to military operations under Wellington but died suddenly on 23 January 1811 while preparing the relief of Badajoz. With Castaños, Romana was the Spanish general most trusted and respected by Wellington. At news of his death, Wellington wrote, "his loss is the greatest which the cause could sustain."

He is credited as being the force behind the construction of the castle at Bendinat.

See also
Marquis of La Romana

Notes

References

Longford, Elizabeth. Wellington: The Years of The Sword. New York: Harper and Row Publishers, 1969.

External links
 :es:Batalla de los Arapiles, whereby a full description is given in this card related to materials for such battle, describing therefore the contents of the following Biography on General Pedro Caro y Sureda: Autor: Martínez Guitian, Luis -Ilustrador: - Editorial: Aldus SA Artes Gráficas. (1944), Santander, 165 pages.
A biography of the Marquis of La Romana by Jose Manuel Rodriguez

1761 births
1811 deaths
People from Palma de Mallorca
Spanish captain generals
Spanish generals
Spanish commanders of the Napoleonic Wars
Marquesses of Romana
University of Salamanca alumni
Captains General of Catalonia